This is a list of awards and nominations received by South Korean actor, model and businessman Lee Jung-jae. Lee is acknowledged for his roles in a variety of film genres, and is internationally famous for his role as Seong Gi-hun in Squid Game.


Awards and nominations

Other accolades

State honors

Listicles

Notes

References 

Lists of awards received by South Korean actor